Martin Axel Thufason (November 11, 1889 in Copenhagen – December 25, 1962 in Glostrup) was a Danish amateur football (soccer) player in the forward position. He played two games for the Denmark national football team, and won a silver medal at the 1912 Summer Olympics.

He started his senior career with Danish club B 93. He made his Danish national team debut in October 1911, and was selected for the Danish team at the 1912 Summer Olympics. He played one match at the tournament, the final game against Great Britain, as Denmark won silver medals. This was to be his last national team game. He played on for B 93, before ending his career with ØB.

His parents moved to Denmark from Sweden with the lastname Tufvesson, but changed this to Thufason of practical reasons. So it was easier to pronounce and spell. But probably they did not make it official in the public registers.

Footnotes

External links
Danish national team profile
DatabaseOlympics profile

1889 births
1962 deaths
Danish people of Swedish descent
Danish men's footballers
Denmark international footballers
Boldklubben af 1893 players
Footballers at the 1912 Summer Olympics
Olympic footballers of Denmark
Olympic silver medalists for Denmark
Olympic medalists in football
Medalists at the 1912 Summer Olympics
Association football forwards
People from Glostrup Municipality
Sportspeople from the Capital Region of Denmark